The Marnes Irisees Superieures Formation is a geological formation in France. It dates back to the Late Triassic .

Vertebrate fauna

See also
 List of dinosaur-bearing rock formations

References

Triassic System of Europe
Norian Stage